Prasophyllum amoenum, commonly known as the dainty leek orchid or Snug leek orchid, is a species of orchid endemic to Tasmania. It has a single tubular, green leaf with a purplish base and between five and twelve light green, dark brown and white flowers. In 2007, the entire population was estimated to be about 600 plants.

Description
As with others in the genus, the flowers are inverted so that the labellum is above the column rather than below it. Flowering occurs in January.

Taxonomy and naming
Prasophyllum amoenum was first formally described in 1998 by David Jones from a specimen collected near Snug and the description was published in Australian Orchid Research. The specific epithet (amoenum) is a Latin word meaning "pleasant" or "delightful".

Distribution and habitat
The dainty leek orchid grows with rushes, sedges and grasses in south-eastern Tasmania.

Conservation
Prasophyllum amoenum is only found in five populations containing a total of 500-600 plants. In some years, no plants have been observed in flower because of drought or browsing. The species is classified as Vulnerable under the Tasmanian Threatened Species Protection Act 1995 and as Endangered under the Commonwealth Government Environment Protection and Biodiversity Conservation Act 1999 (EPBC) Act.

References

amoenum
Endemic flora of Tasmania
Endemic orchids of Australia
Plants described in 1998